Blake Shelton's Barn & Grill is the third studio album by American country music artist Blake Shelton. Released in 2004 on Warner Bros. Records Nashville, it is his second album to achieve RIAA platinum certification. The album produced four singles in "When Somebody Knows You That Well", "Some Beach", "Goodbye Time" and "Nobody but Me." Like his previous album, he co-wrote two songs.

Content
The album's lead-off single, "When Somebody Knows You That Well", was co-written by Harley Allen, who had also co-written Shelton's 2003 single "The Baby". "When Somebody Knows You That Well" peaked at number 37 on the Billboard charts, becoming the lowest-charting single of his career. Following this song was Shelton's third Number One hit, "Some Beach", which spent four weeks at Number One in late 2004—early 2005. After this song came a cover of Conway Twitty's 1988 hit "Goodbye Time", with which Shelton reached number 10, and finally, the number 4 "Nobody but Me".

"Cotton Pickin' Time", one of two Paul Overstreet co-writes on this album, was previously a number 34 country hit in 1989 for The Marcy Brothers from their debut album Missing You, and "What's on My Mind" was previously recorded by Gary Allan on his 2001 album Alright Guy.

"I Drink" was originally recorded by Mary Gauthier, who co-wrote the song. Gauthier released the song on her 1999 album Drag Queens in Limousines.

Track listing

Personnel 
Compiled from liner notes.

 Blake Shelton – lead vocals, acoustic guitar (1, 9)
 Gordon Mote – acoustic piano (2, 4, 5)
 Tim Lauer – Hammond B3 organ (2-11), Wurlitzer electric piano "left hand" (3), keyboards (8), string arrangements and conductor (8)
 Bobby Braddock – Minimoog (3), Wurlitzer electric piano "right hand" (3), synthesizer interlude on fadeout (4), string arrangements (8)
 Scott Joyce – additional keyboards (4)
 Mike Rojas – acoustic piano (6-11)
 Brent Rowan – electric guitars, bass (1, 3)
 Bryan Sutton – acoustic guitar (2, 4-7, 9), 5-string banjo (4)
 Byrd Burton – acoustic guitar (3)
 Frank DeBretti, Jr. – slide guitar (6)
 John Willis – acoustic guitar (8, 10, 11)
 Paul Franklin – steel guitar (1, 2, 4, 5, 7-11), lap steel guitar (6)
 Sonny Garrish – steel guitar (3)
 Alison Prestwood – bass (2, 4, 5, 8-11)
 Glenn Worf – bass (6, 7)
 Shannon Forrest – drums
 Ed Seay – additional crash cymbals (1, 3)
 Shawn Simpson – shaker (1)
 Terry McMillan — harmonica (6), Jew's harp (6), wolf whistle (6)
 Jonathan Yudkin – fiddle (1, 6, 7), backing fiddle (3), cello (2, 5), viola (2, 5), violin (2)
 Rob Hajacos – solo fiddles (3), fiddle (4, 8-11)
 Carole Rabinowitz – cello (8)
 Kristin Wilkinson – viola (8)
 David Davidson – violin (5, 8)
 David Angell – violin (8)
 Conni Ellisor – violin (8)
 Michael Goode – music copyist (8)
 Carl Jackson – backing vocals (1)
 Leslie Satcher – backing vocals (1)
 Melodie Crittenden – backing vocals (2, 4, 5, 6, 8, 9, 11)
 Blue Miller – backing vocals (2), harmony vocals (3, 4)
 Danny Myrick – backing vocals (4, 9)
 Dennis Wilson – backing vocals (4, 5, 8, 9, 11)
 Wes Hightower – backing vocals (5, 8, 11)
 John Wesley Ryles – backing vocals (5, 8), harmony vocals (10)
 Paul Overstreet – backing vocals (6)
 Curtis Young – harmony vocals (7)
 Rachel Proctor – harmony vocals (11)

Production 
 Bobby Braddock — producer
 Ed Seay – engineer, mixing, additional engineer 
 Scott Kidd – assistant engineer 
 Greg Lawrence – assistant engineer 
 Hank Williams – mastering at MasterMix (Nashville, Tennessee)
 Milly Catignangi – production coordinator 
 Katya Karagadayeva – album design 
 Jim "Señor" McGuire – photography 
 Michael McCall – hair grooming 
 Libby Mitchell – stylist 
 John Dorris – management 
 Hallmark Direction – management

Chart performance

Weekly charts

Year-end charts

Singles

Certifications

References

External links
 "Blake Shelton - Blake Shelton's Barn & Grill Cut by Cut" on About.com

2004 albums
Blake Shelton albums
Warner Records albums